The 49th Cuban National Series was won by Industriales over Villa Clara. Sancti Spíritus, who had the best regular season record, lost in the first round. Defending champion La Habana were eliminated in the semifinals.

Regular season standings

West

East

Playoffs

References

Cuban National Series seasons
Cuban National Series
Cuban National Series
2009 in Cuban sport